Tomi is a common name. In Finnish, it is a masculine name. In Japan, it can be a feminine or masculine given name. Notable persons with that name include:

Persons with the given name
Tomi Adeyemi (born 1993), American author
Tomi Ameobi (born 1988), English footballer
 Tomi Rae Hynie (born 1969), American singer 
 Tomi Janežič, Slovenian theatre director and professor
 Tomi Joutsen (born 1975), Finnish musician
 Tomi Kallio (born 1977), Finnish  ice hockey player
 Tomi Kalliola (born 1979), Finnish musician
 Tomi Karhunen (born 1989), Finnish ice hockey player
 Tomi Koivusaari (born 1973), Finnish musician
 Tomi Lahren (born 1992), American television and online video host
 Tomi Lotta (born 1976), Finnish strongman competitor
 Tomi Maanoja (born 1986), Finnish footballer
 Tomi Mäki (born 1983), Finnish ice hockey player
 Tomi Nybäck (born 1985), Finnish chess and poker player
 Tomi Pallassalo (born 1989), Finnish ice hockey player
 Tomi Petrescu (born 1986), Finnish footballer
 Tomi Pettinen (born 1977), Finnish  ice hockey player
 Tomi Poikolainen (born 1961), Finnish archer
 Tomi Pöllänen (born 1978), Finnish  ice hockey player
 Tomi Putaansuu (born 1974), Finnish musician
 Tomi Räisänen (born 1976), Finnish composer
 Tomi Sallinen (born 1989), Finnish  ice hockey player
 Tomi Shimomura (born 1980), Austrian-Japanese footballer
 Tomi Sovilj, Serbian musician
 Tomi Ståhlhammar (born 1988), Finnish ice hockey player
 Tomi Swick, Canadian singer-songwriter 
 Tomi Taira (born 1928), Japanese actress 
 Tomi Tuuha (born 1989), Finnish artistic gymnast
 Tomi Ungerer, French illustrator

Fictional characters 
 Tomi Shishido, comic book character
 Tomi Kisaragi, one of the 13 main protagonists of the video game 13 Sentinels: Aegis Rim

See also 
 Tomislav
 Tommy (disambiguation)
 Tommie

Finnish masculine given names